Parexoletuncus is a genus of moths belonging to the family Tortricidae.

Species
Parexoletuncus mundius Razowski, 1997

See also
List of Tortricidae genera

References

 , 2005: World catalogue of insects volume 5 Tortricidae.
  1997: Acta zool. cracov. 40: 81

External links
tortricidae.com

Euliini
Tortricidae genera